Dakky (Dakkı) is a rural locality (a selo), and one of two settlements in Zhokhsogonsky Rural Okrug of Tattinsky District in the Sakha Republic, Russia, in addition to Borobul, the administrative center of the Rural Okrug. Its population as of the 2002 Census was 5.

References

Notes

Sources
Official website of the Sakha Republic. Registry of the Administrative-Territorial Divisions of the Sakha Republic. Tattinsky District. 

Rural localities in Tattinsky District